Hakea trineura is a flowering plant in the family Proteaceae and is endemic to Queensland. The branches and leaves are covered with rusty hairs and the pendulous flowers are greenish-yellow.

Description
The branchlets and new leaf growth have flattened, brown, short soft silky hairs, or are smooth. The leaves narrow gradually to the apex ending either with a sharp point or rounded.

Taxonomy and naming
Hakea trineura  was first formally described in 1868 by Ferdinand von Mueller who gave it the name Grevillea trineura and published the description in Fragmenta Phytographiae Australiae. In 1868 Mueller changed the name to Hakea trineura. It is said to be named from the Greek trineura  referring to the three-veined leaves. Trineura is however not attested in ancient Greek.

Distribution and habitat
Hakea trineura is restricted to the Maryborough to Rockhampton area of  Queensland. It grows in hilly eucalyptus woodland over hummock grasslands. It is a quick growing shrub in tropical areas.

Conservation status
Hakea trineura is listed as "vulnerable" by the Australian Department of the Environment Protection and Biodiversity Conservation Act.

References

trineura
Flora of Queensland
Plants described in 1863
Taxa named by Ferdinand von Mueller